Novak Djokovic was the defending champion, but lost to Roger Federer 6–4, 3–6, 6–1 in the final.

Seeds

Draw

Finals

Top half

Bottom half

Qualifying

Seeds

Qualifiers

Lucky losers

Draw

First qualifier

Second qualifier

Third qualifier

Fourth qualifier

External links
Main Draw
Qualifying Draw

Davidoff Swiss Indoors - Singles
Singles